The 1st Parliament of Queen Elizabeth I was ruled over by Queen Elizabeth I of England on 5 December 1558 and assembled on 23 January 1559. This Parliament would restore many of the laws created by Henry VIII and the English Reformation Parliament. Queen Elizabeth's 1st Parliament passed some 24 public statutes and 17 private measures by the time it was dissolved on 8 May 1559.

Background
At the state opening of Parliament, the Lord Keeper Sir Nicholas Bacon informed the house that one of the main reasons for summoning the Parliament was to establish a uniform order of religion’. He also drew attention to the recent loss of Calais and the need to maintain England's navy and coastal defences. The speech summarised Elizabeth’s manifesto for the whole of her reign i.e. to restore stability, prosperity and peace to the country. She approved the appointment of Sir Thomas Gargrave, sitting for Yorkshire, as Speaker of the House.

The membership of the Lower House (the House of Commons) numbered 402, of whom only a quarter had survived from the previous Parliament in the reign of the Catholic Queen Mary. The membership of the Upper House (the House of Lords), however, still favoured Catholicism. After much debate the Commons held sway and two essential acts were passed into law, the Act of Supremacy and the Act of Uniformity. Collectively referred to as the Elizabethan Religious Settlement, the former confirmed the break from Rome and the latter more Protestant practices for the Church of England.

A committee was established to guarantee the Queen's financial stability. She was also petitioned to marry and secure the succession, notwithstanding their concern about the approach from Queen Mary's widower, the Catholic King Philip II of Spain, which in the event was rebuffed by Elizabeth.

Acts
The major pieces of legislation from the Reformation Parliament included:

1558 Act of Supremacy
This act gave full ecclesiastical authority to the monarchy and abolished the authority of the Pope in England. This act restored a law that had previously been issued by Henry VIII in 1534, and partially repealed by Mary I in 1555.

1558 Act of Uniformity
Re-introduced the English Book of Common Prayer, with the order of prayer changed to make the Protestant book more acceptable to traditional Catholic worshippers and clergy. It also established that all persons go to Church once a week or suffer a fairly steep fine.

1558 Treason Act
Declared that directly saying, publishing, declaring, or holding the opinion that the Queen or her heirs are not the rightful Queens or Kings was Treason. Anyone so accused would lose their land and property to the Crown before being imprisoned for the rest of their lives.

1558 First Fruits and Tenths Act
This Act restored the “First and Tenths”, a Tax on the clergy of Great Britain. The clergy would pay a portion of their first year’s earnings, and thereafter pay a tenth of their revenue once per year. This tax had originally been established by Henry VIII to claim money intended for the papacy.

See also
 Acts of the 1st Parliament
 List of parliaments of England
 English Reformation Parliament

References

 
 

1558 establishments in England
1558 in politics